The 2020–21 Serie B (known as the Serie BKT for sponsorship reasons) was the 89th season of the Serie B since its establishment in 1929. It started on 25 September 2020 and ended on 10 May 2021.

On 5 November 2020, Serie B announced it would use VAR from the second half of the season. However, it was used only on promotion play-off matches. DAZN broadcast all matches live domestically, with MyCujoo further distributing games in 15 countries.

Changes
The following teams have changed division since the 2019–20 season:

To Serie B
Relegated from Serie A
 Lecce
 Brescia
 SPAL

Promoted from Serie C
 Monza (Group A)
 Vicenza (Group B)
 Reggina (Group C)
 Reggiana (Play-off winners)

From Serie B
Promoted to Serie A
 Benevento
 Crotone
 Spezia

Relegated to Serie C
 Perugia
 Trapani
 Juve Stabia
 Livorno

Teams

Stadiums and locations

Number of teams by regions

Personnel and kits

Managerial changes

League table

Positions by round
The table lists the positions of teams after each week of matches. In order to preserve chronological evolvements, any postponed matches are not included to the round at which they were originally scheduled, but added to the full round they were played immediately afterwards.

Results

Promotion play-offs
Rules:
 Preliminary round: the higher-placed team plays at home. If teams are tied after regular time, extra-time is played. If scores are still level, the higher-placed team advances;
 Semi-finals: the higher-placed team plays at home for second leg. If teams are tied on aggregate, the higher-placed team advances;
 Final: the higher-placed team plays at home for second leg. If teams are tied on aggregate, the higher-placed team is promoted to Serie A, unless the teams finished tied on points after regular season, in which case winner is decided by extra-time and a penalty shootout if necessary.

Preliminary round

Semi-finals

First leg

Second leg

Final

First leg

Second leg

Relegation play-out
The relegation play-out was not played because the 16th-placed team Ascoli finished more than 4 points ahead of 17th-placed team Cosenza, then they were relegated directly to Serie C. Cosenza was later readmitted to replace the excluded Chievo.

Season statistics

Top goalscorers

Note
1 Player scored 1 goal in the play-offs.

Top assists

Hat-tricks

Note
4 Player scored four goals ; (H) – Home  (A) – Away

Clean sheets

Note
1 Player kept 1 clean sheet in the play-offs.
2 Player kept 2 clean sheets in the play-offs.

Awards

XI of the Season

References

External links

 

Serie B seasons
Italy
1